Béla Bartók Music High School of Miskolc (Miskolci Bartók Béla Zeneművészeti Szakközépiskola) is situated in the Palace of Music (Zenepalota) in Bartók square Miskolc, Hungary. It is a famous music school named after the famous Hungarian composer Béla Bartók. It was founded in 1966.

History of secondary music teaching in Miskolc 

Music teaching in Miskolc has more than 100-year-old tradition. First, secondary vocational training became independent of music schools, then as a result of this a teacher training college was founded in addition to the secondary training. All the primary, secondary and tertiary but cooperating and relying on each other. The growing expectations of the public concerning our school as well, made it possible to incorporate general subjects into the curriculum. Nowadays secondary music education has to provide students with proper knowledge for further musical learning.

The building ’Music Palace’ 

The building in which the school is located is called the ’Palace of Music’, which was built in neo-rococo style in 1927. It has a beautiful concert hall with excellent acoustics and is an ideal home for concerts and music teaching.

Béla Bartók Music High School in Miskolc started its first school year in 1966, based on the work of former musical institutions in the town. It is a music high school offering education and professional music training at the same time. This way complementarity plays here a significant role when it comes to teaching academic and music subjects.

Music is a profile building part of curriculum with an advanced level of requirements and a large number of lessons devoted to it. The core therefore that sets music high schools apart from a regular high school is the duality of high school education and professional music teaching. The institution plays an important role in the region because it is the only music high school in three neighbouring counties – Borsod-Abaúj-Zemplém, Heves and Nógrád.

Faculties of the school 

Piano, organ, violin, viola, cello, contrabass, guitar, flute, oboe, clarinet, bassoon, trumpet, French horn, trombone, tuba, percussion instruments, solo-singing, solmization, theory of music, folk music, church music and jazz (singing, percussion, saxophon, trumpet), harpsichord.

Music education 

Children come to study in the school after basic vocational training, but all of them have to take an entrance examination in front of a professional board and can choose among 24 faculties. The music subjects are taught by both professional instrument specialists and music teachers.
The compulsory music subjects which are included in the curriculum are the following: the main subject, solmization, theory of music, literature of music and piano, which is compulsory to all students.
The school attributes great importance to individual instrumental and theoretical training and emphasizes the importance of working in music orchestras, for example, playing in chamber-music groups, string-, wind-, or symphonic orchestras and singing in choirs. These subjects can be chosen as electives.
According to the statistics 97% of the school-leavers go on to music colleges or the Academy of Music and just a few choose other professions.

General education 

Besides musical education the school pays special attention to general subjects, they are part of the curriculum. One of the special subjects of the school within the physics is acoustics. A lot of students choose it as an elective subject for their school leaving exams. In addition, students have the opportunity to learn English or German languages and the school offers them the opportunity to learn Italian as well.

There are no more than 25 students in each class, which is ideal for both the sophisticated artistic work and for the effective teaching and studying processes. The education lasts for 5 years. At the end of the 4th year students can take the school leaving exam in the general subjects. After completing the 5th year they take a professional exam in music and get their qualifications as musicians. They can go on with their studies in any institution of higher education. For obvious reasons, most of the students choose music colleges or the Academy of Music.

Sources 
Palace of Music (Miskolc)

http://www.facebook.com/bartokmiskolc

Music schools in Hungary
Béla Bartók